Players who have played at least one game for the Pittsburgh Penguins of the National Hockey League (NHL) from 1967–68 to present.


Key
  Current Team player.
  Current NHL player.

The "Seasons" column lists the first year of the season of the player's first game and the last year of the season of the player's last game. For example, a player who played one game in the 2000–2001 season would be listed as playing with the team from 2000–2001, regardless of what calendar year the game occurred within.

Goaltenders

Notes
a: As of the 2005–2006 NHL season, all games have a winner; teams losing in overtime and shootouts are awarded one point thus the OTL stat replaces the tie statistic. The OTL column also includes SOL (Shootout losses).

Skaters

References

HockeyDB.com
NHL Skaters – Pittsburgh Penguins
NHL Goaltenders – Pittsburgh Penguins

Pittsburgh Penguins
 
players